Phalaris lemmonii is an uncommon species of grass known by the common name Lemmon's canarygrass. It is endemic to California, where it can be found in coastal and inland mountain ranges and the Central Valley.

Description
It grows mainly in moist areas. It is an annual grass reaching maximum heights between 1.3 and 1.5 meters. The cylindrical inflorescence is up to 12 centimeters long, each spikelet made up of one strongly beaked fertile floret and one or two sterile florets.

External links
Jepson Manual Treatment
USDA Plants Profile
Grass Manual Treatment
Photo gallery

lemmonii
Native grasses of California